Pelturagonia borneensis, the Sabah eyebrow lizard, is a species of agamid lizard. It is endemic to Indonesia.

References

Pelturagonia
Reptiles of Indonesia
Reptiles described in 1960
Taxa named by Robert F. Inger
Taxobox binomials not recognized by IUCN
Reptiles of Borneo